Luteostriata abundans is a species of Brazilian land planarian in the subfamily Geoplaninae. It is a common species in human-disturbed areas in Brazil's southernmost state, Rio Grande do Sul.

Description 

Luteostriata abundans is a small to medium-sized land planarian with an elongate body and parallel margins. The largest specimens have a length of about 60 millimeters or more. The dorsum has a yellow tinge, varying from cream to dark yellow or light brown and is marked by seven longitudinal dark brown to black stripes. The ventral side is cream.

The numerous eyes are very small and hardly visible to the naked eye. They are distributed marginally on the first millimeters of the body and posteriorly become dorsal, covering the two most external stripes on each side. The eyes that cover the stripes are surrounded by halos, zones without pigmentation, which may be perceived as small clear dots.

Distribution 
Luteostriata abundans is found in human-disturbed areas and borders of semi-deciduous and deciduous seasonal forests in the region surrounding the Porto Alegre Metropolitan Area, state of Rio Grande do Sul, Brazil.

Diet 
In the laboratory, the diet of L. abundans includes exclusively woodlice, which seem to constitute the main or only prey of most species in the genus Luteostriata.

Luteostriata abundans captures the prey by the use of quick muscular movements and adhesive secretions. As soon as the planarian touches the prey, it coils around it and starts to secrete mucus. The planarian then glides over the prey to bring it to the level of the mouth and everts the pharynx, piercing the woodlouse between its segments and beginning the ingestion of its contents.

References

External links 
Friday Fellow: 'Abundant Yellow-Striped Flatworm' at Earthling Nature.

Geoplanidae
Invertebrates of Brazil